The Eurovision Song Contest 1996 was the 41st edition of the Eurovision Song Contest, held on 18 May 1996 at the  in Oslo, Norway.

Thirty countries submitted entries to the contest, with a non-public, audio-only qualifying round held two months before the final to reduce the number of participants from 30 to 23.

This was the final contest where the results were determined solely by jury voting, with a trial use of televoting in the  leading to widespread adoption from  onwards.

Location

It was the second time that Norway had hosted the contest, following the  staged in Bergen. The arena's maximum capacity of 11,500 was reduced to around 6,000 for the contest.

Production

The Eurovision Song Contest 1996 was produced by the Norwegian public broadcaster  (NRK). Odd Arvid Strømstad served as executive producer, Pål Veiglum served as director, Bjarte Ulfstein served as designer, and Frode Thingnæs served as musical director, leading the Norwegian Radio Orchestra. The show was presented by journalist and television presenter Ingvild Bryn and singer and lead vocalist of the Norwegian band a-ha Morten Harket. The contest underwent a re-brand for this edition, as NRK set out to improve the image of the competition and broaden its audience appeal. The event was referred to by the hosts and through on-screen captions as Eurosong '96, the only occasion in which this contraction was officially used to refer to the event.

Rehearsals in the contest venue for the competing acts began on 13 May 1996. Each country had two technical rehearsals in the week approaching the contest, with countries rehearsing in the order in which they would perform. The first rehearsals took place on 13 and 14 May, with each country allowed 40 minutes total on stage, followed by 20 minutes to review recordings with producers and to consult on suggested changes, and then a 20 minute press conference. Each country's second rehearsals took place on 15 and 16 May, with 30 minutes total on stage followed by another 20 minute press conference. A full technical rehearsal with all artists took place on the afternoon of 17 May, followed by two dress rehearsals with an audience on the evening of 17 May and the following afternoon.

In addition to his role as host, Harket also performed the song "Heaven's Not for Saints" as the show's opening act. The interval act, entitled "" or "Beacon Burning", was created by Petter Skavlan. The film section featured performances by Torbjørg Aamlid Paus, Bukkene Bruse, Bendik Hofseth, Håvard Gimse, Helge Kjekshus, the Brazz Brothers, Mari Boine and Terje Rypdal.

NRK introduced visual effects to the contest for the first time. Computer-generated imagery (CGI) was featured as overlays during the broadcast of the competing entries, and the voting segment was conducted via chroma key technology built by Silicon Graphics, with host Ingvild Bryn situated in the "blue room" to the side of the performance area and the contest scoreboard being rendered virtually using CGI. The chroma key virtual backdrop was also included live footage of the artists in the green room backstage, as well as virtually representing the video feeds of each country's spokespersons as they delivered their country's points.

Format
Each participating broadcaster submitted one song, which was required to be no longer than three minutes in duration and performed in the language, or one of the languages, of the country which it represented. A maximum of six performers were allowed on stage during each country's performance, and all participants were required to have reached the age of 16 in the year of the contest. Each entry could utilise all or part of the live orchestra and could use instrumental-only backing tracks, however any backing tracks used could only include the sound of instruments featured on stage being mimed by the performers.

New qualification system
In 1996, a trial qualification process replaced the relegation system used from 1993 to 1995, whereby the lowest-ranked countries in each final were eliminated from the following year's contest. Under the new procedure, an audio preselection was organised for all participating countries, apart from the host country Norway, which received an automatic right to compete in the final, to be joined by an additional 22 countries. National juries in all competing countries, including Norway, listened to the submitted entries on audio tape, with juries required to listen to all songs three times before voting. Each of the eight members on each country's jury awarded their favourite song twelve points, their second-favourite ten points, their third-favourite eight points, with subsequent points being awarded consecutively down to each juror's tenth-favourite song being awarded one point, with the points awarded by all jurors being totalled to determine each country's top ten songs which were awarded points in the same manner. Jury members who voted in the qualifying round were not allowed to sit on the jury for the final.

The European Broadcasting Union (EBU) required all entries to be submitted by 20March 1996. Jury voting was held on 20 and 21 March, with the qualifying countries publicly revealed on 22 March, at the same time as the running order draw for the final was conducted. The full results of how individual juries had voted was not intended to be revealed publicly, but the full breakdown has since become available.

Voting procedure 

The results of the 1996 contest were determined using the scoring system introduced in : each country awarded twelve points to its favourite entry, followed by ten points to its second favourite, and then awarded points in decreasing value from eight to one for the remaining songs which featured in the country's top ten, with countries unable to vote for their own entry. The points awarded by each country were determined by an assembled jury of sixteen individuals, which was required to be split evenly between members of the public and music professionals, comprised additionally of an equal number of men and women, and below and above 30 years of age. Each jury member voted in secret and awarded between one and ten votes to each participating song, excluding that from their own country and with no abstentions permitted. The votes of each member were collected following the country's performance and then tallied by the non-voting jury chairperson to determine the points to be awarded. In any cases where two or more songs in the top ten received the same number of votes, a show of hands by all jury members was used to determine the final placing.

Postcards 
The "postcards" were 70-second video introductions shown on television whilst the stage is being prepared for the next contestant to perform their entry; the postcards for each country at the 1996 contest was made up of three segments. In the first segment the participating country was highlighted geographically on a map of Europe, followed by video footage of that country's competing artist or artists in their home country during their day-to-day lives, which also featured each artist packing a branded backpack with important items which they would take with them to Oslo. The second segment featured footage of nature scenes in Norway as well as Norwegian people in everyday life, often accompanied by music from Norwegian electronic group Subgud. The final segment consisted of a pre-recorded good luck message from a representative of each respective country in the language of that country. The seniority of these figures varied between the different countries; among the contributors were then-President of Turkey Süleyman Demirel, who survived an assassination attempt on the day of the contest, and then-Prime Minister of Portugal António Guterres, who would later become the Secretary-General of the United Nations in 2017. The individuals who provided messages for each country are shown below, alongside the position which they held at the time of the contest and the language in which they provided their message.

 Süleyman Demirel, President of Turkey (Turkish)
 Virginia Bottomley, Secretary of State for National Heritage (English)
 Alberto Escudero Claramunt, Spanish Ambassador to Norway (Spanish)
 António Guterres, Prime Minister of Portugal (Portuguese)
 Glafcos Clerides, President of Cyprus (Greek)
 Edoardo Fenech Adami, Prime Minister of Malta (Maltese)
 Zlatko Mateša, Prime Minister of Croatia (Croatian)
 Elisabeth Gehrer, Federal Minister for Education and Cultural Affairs (German)
 Michel Coquoz, Swiss chargé d'affaires in Norway (French)
 Caterína Dimaki, Greek chargé d'affaires in Norway (Greek)
 Tiit Vähi, Prime Minister of Estonia (Estonian)
 Gro Harlem Brundtland, Prime Minister of Norway (Norwegian)
 Philippe Douste-Blazy, Minister of Culture (French)
 Milan Kučan, President of Slovenia (Slovene)
 Aad Nuis, State Secretary of Education, Culture and Science (Dutch)
 Luc Van den Brande, Minister-President of Flanders (Dutch)
 John Bruton, Taoiseach (English)
 Riitta Uosukainen, Speaker of the Parliament of Finland (Finnish)
 Davíð Oddsson, Prime Minister of Iceland (Icelandic)
 Aleksander Kwaśniewski, President of Poland (Polish)
 Alija Izetbegović, President of the Presidency of Bosnia and Herzegovina (Bosnian)
 Vladimír Mečiar, Prime Minister of Slovakia (Slovak)
 Göran Persson, Prime Minister of Sweden (Swedish)

Participating countries
A total of thirty countries submitted entries for the 1996 contest, however per the rules of the event only twenty-three countries would be allowed to participate in the final. Norway, by virtue of being the host country, was guaranteed a place in the final, with all remaining countries competing in the qualifying round in order to gain a spot in the event.

This marked the first time that Germany was absent from the contest and remains the only occasion to date where the nation has not participated in the contest final.

Qualifying round
The qualifying round took place on 20 and 21 March 1996, and the results were announced on 22 March. The table below outlines the participating countries, the order in which the juries listened to the entries, the competing artists and songs, and the results of the voting. Countries were ordered alphabetically by ISO two-letter country code.

Hungary and  tied on the same score for the final qualification place, however Finland qualified for the contest due to them having received the highest individual score (8 points) compared to Hungary (7 points).

Conductors
A separate musical director could be nominated by each country to lead the orchestra during their performance, with the host musical director, Frode Thingnæs, also available to conduct for those countries which did not nominate their own conductor. The conductors listed below led the orchestra during the performance for the indicated countries.

 Levent Çoker
 Ernie Dunstall
 Eduardo Leiva
 
 Stavros Lantsias
 Paul Abela
 Alan Bjelinski
 
 Rui dos Reis
 
 Tarmo Leinatamm
 Frode Thingnæs
 Fiachra Trench
 Jože Privšek
 Dick Bakker
 Bob Porter
 Noel Kelehan
 Olli Ahvenlahti
 
 
 Sinan Alimanović
 Juraj Burian
 Anders Berglund

Participants and results 

The contest took place on 18 May 1996 at 21:00 (CEST) and lasted 3 hours and 7 minutes. The table below outlines the participating countries, the order in which they performed, the competing artists and songs, and the results of the voting.

The contest featured two representatives who had performed as lead artists in previous contests.

The winner was  represented by the song "The Voice", written by Brendan Graham and performed by Eimear Quinn. Graham recorded his second contest win in three years as a songwriter, having previously written the winning song of the 1994 contest "Rock 'n' Roll Kids", and thus became one of five individuals to have won the contest more than once as an artist or songwriter , alongside Willy van Hemert, Yves Dessca, Johnny Logan and Rolf Løvland. ,  and  achieved their highest placings to date by finishing fourth, fifth and sixth respectively, while  finished in last place for the eighth time.

During the announcement on the Spanish votes the Spanish spokesperson Belén Fernández de Henestrosa referred to the Netherlands as "Holland", which was misheard by Ingvild Bryn as "Poland" and which resulted in the Spanish six points being incorrectly attributed to the latter country. The results of the contest were amended several months after the event to correct this, and the tables in this article present the corrected results as published by the EBU.

Detailed voting results 

Jury voting was used to determine the points awarded by all countries. The announcement of the results from each country was conducted in the order in which they performed, with the spokespersons announcing their country's points in English or French in ascending order. The detailed breakdown of the points awarded by each country is listed in the tables below.

Qualifying round

12 points
The below table summarises how the maximum 12 points were awarded from one country to another in the qualifying round.

Final

12 points 
The below table summarises how the maximum 12 points were awarded from one country to another in the final. The winning country is shown in bold.

Spokespersons 

Each country nominated a spokesperson who was responsible for announcing, in English or French, the votes for their respective country. Spokespersons at the 1996 contest are listed below.

 
 Colin Berry
 Belén Fernández de Henestrosa
 Cristina Rocha
 Marios Skordis
 Ruth Amaira
 
 
 Yves Ménestrier
 Niki Venega
 Annika Talvik
 Ragnhild Sælthun Fjørtoft
 Laurent Broomhead
 
 Marcha
 An Ploegaerts
 Eileen Dunne
 Solveig Herlin
 Svanhildur Konráðsdóttir
 Jan Chojnacki
 Segmedina Srna
 
 Ulla Rundqvist

Broadcasts 

Each participating broadcaster was required to relay the contest via its networks. Non-participating EBU member broadcasters were also able to relay the contest as "passive participants". Broadcasters were able to send commentators to provide coverage of the contest in their own native language and to relay information about the artists and songs to their television viewers. Known details on the broadcasts in each country, including the specific broadcasting stations and commentators are shown in the tables below.

Notes and references

Notes

References

Bibliography

External links

 

 
1996
1996 in music
1996 in Norwegian music
May 1996 events in Europe
1996 in Norway
1990s in Oslo
1996 in Norwegian television
Events in Oslo
Festivals in Oslo
Music in Oslo
Music festivals in Norway